James Martin Hogan is primarily known as co-founder of the worldwide Outward Bound movement of outdoor adventure education schools, along with Kurt Hahn and Lawrence Durning Holt, having been the first warden of the sea school - the first Outward Bound school - established in Aberdyfi, Wales by Holt to train crews of his Blue Funnel Line. Hogan has been credited with choosing the now-famous Outward Bound motto: "To serve, to strive, and not to yield." Hogan was a Boy Scout leader and Wood Badge holder.

References

Bibliography
 Hogan, James Martin, Impelled Into Experiences: the story of the Outward Bound schools, Educational Productions, 1968. . .
 Richards, Anthony, The Genesis of Outward Bound. 
 Wagstaff, Mark, A History of Challenge Courses. 
 Zelinski, Mark, 1991, Outward Bound: The Inward Odyssey, Hillsboro, Oregon: Beyond Words.

Outdoor educators
Year of birth missing
Place of birth missing
Nationality missing